Shahrak-e Sizadehaban (also Romanized as Shahrak-e Sīzadehābān; also known as Poshteh-ye Banān (Persian: پشته بنان) and Poshtehbanān) is a village in Abnama Rural District, in the Central District of Rudan County, Hormozgan Province, Iran. At the 2006 census, its population was 937, in 205 families.

References 

Populated places in Rudan County